The Wine Institute is a public policy advocacy organization representing over 1,000 California wineries and affiliated businesses. Led by Bobby Koch, its mission is "to initiate state, federal, and international public policy to enhance the environment for the responsible production, consumption and enjoyment of wine." The Wine Institute is the only advocacy group representing the California wine industry at the state, federal and international levels.

The organization's initiatives include:
 a partnership with the California Travel and Tourism Commission to showcase California's wine and food offerings
 an export program providing marketing support for California wines outside the US with trade representation in 16 countries
 promotion of sustainable winegrowing, in conjunction with the California Association of Winegrape Growers

The Institute is based in San Francisco, with offices in Sacramento, Washington, D.C., six regions of the United States and 16 countries abroad.

See also
Leon Adams, co-founder of the Wine Institute

References

External links 

Wine industry organizations
Organizations based in San Francisco
California wine organizations
Organizations established in 1934
1934 establishments in California
Food and drink in the San Francisco Bay Area
Alcohol industry trade associations
501(c)(6) nonprofit organizations